Young's Cove Group is a stratigraphic group covering the Ediacaran-Cambrian boundary (in the Chapel Island Formation, cropping out on the Burin Peninsula and elsewhere in Newfoundland.

The Rencontre Formation is sometime included in this group, sometimes in the Long Harbour Group.

References

Ediacaran Newfoundland and Labrador
Cambrian Newfoundland and Labrador